Tien Hsin (born Wu Tien-hsin on November 11, 1975) is a Taiwanese actress, television host and singer. She won a Golden Bell Award for Best Leading Actress in a Television Series in 2011 for the drama series Who's the One.

Personal life
She has been married to South Korean photographer Kim Yeong-min since 2016.

Selected filmography

Television series

Film

Host

Variety show

Event

Music video appearances

Discography

Studio albums

Theater

Published works

Awards and nominations

References

External links

 
 
  

1975 births
Living people
Taiwanese television actresses
Taiwanese film actresses
Taiwanese stage actresses
Taiwanese women television presenters
20th-century Taiwanese actresses
21st-century Taiwanese actresses
Actresses from New Taipei
Musicians from New Taipei
20th-century Taiwanese women singers